The Slovak Orienteering Association is the national Orienteering Association in Slovakia. It is recognized as the orienteering association for the Slovakia by the International Orienteering Federation, of which it is a member.

References

External links
 Official website of the Slovenský zväz orientačných športov (SZOŠ)

See also 
 Slovak orienteers

Ori
International Orienteering Federation members